De Kroonduif, a former subsidiary of Dutch airline KLM, was the national carrier of Netherlands New Guinea (present day Western New Guinea, Indonesia), between 1955 and 1963. The name 'kroonduif' is the Dutch term for the crowned pigeon endemic to New Guinea, which was assumed as the logo of the company.

History
On 14 July 1955, the company Nederlands Nieuw Guinea Luchtvaart Maatschappij (NNGLM) was established as a subsidiary of Dutch airline KLM, to provide air services within the Dutch territory of Netherlands New Guinea. This new airline, operating under the name of De Kroonduif, was based at Biak, and operated several routes throughout the territory with two de Havilland Canada Beavers.

Later the fleet was also supplemented with Douglas DC-3 Dakotas and Twin Pioneers.

As Dutch New Guinea was being incorporated into Indonesian territory on 1 January 1963, the operations of De Kroonduif were absorbed by Indonesian airline Garuda Indonesia, which shortly afterwards assigned them to Merpati Nusantara Airlines, a company that since 1978 was fully owned by Garuda.

Destinations
According to the De Kroonduif timetable dated 1 December 1958, at the time the following destinations were served:
Biak, Ajamaroe, Fak Fak, Hollandia, Kaimana, Kebar, Kokonao, Manawi, Manokwari, Merauke, Napan, Noemfoer, Ransiki, Sorong, Steenkool, Tanahmerah, Teminaboean, Wasior, Wisselmeren

See also 
Merpati Nusantara destinations
List of Garuda Indonesia destinations

References
 Time Table, De Kroonduif, 1 December 1958
 Vliegen in het stenen tijdperk: De Dakota's van de Kroonduif (Dutch)

Organizations based in Netherlands New Guinea
Defunct airlines of Indonesia
Airlines established in 1955
Airlines disestablished in 1963
1955 establishments in Netherlands New Guinea
1963 disestablishments in Indonesia